The indigenous peoples of California are the indigenous inhabitants who have previously lived or currently live within the current boundaries of California before and after the arrival of Europeans.

Achomawi, Achumawi, Pit River tribe, northeastern California
Atsugewi, northeastern California
Ahwahnechee, eastern-central California
Cahuilla, southern California
Chumash, coastal southern California
Barbareño
Cruzeño, Island Chumash
Inezeño, Ineseño
Obispeño, Northern Chumash
Purisimeño
Ventureño
Chilula, northwestern California
Chimariko, extinct, northwestern California
Coso, southeastern California
Cupeño, southern California
Eel River Athapaskan peoples
Lassik, northwestern California
Mattole, Bear River, northwestern California
Nongatl, northwestern California
Sinkyone, northwestern California
Wailaki, Wai-lakki, northwestern California
Esselen, west-central California
Hupa, northwestern California
Tsnungwe
Juaneño, Acjachemem, southwestern California
Karok, northwestern California
Kato, Cahto, northwestern California
Kawaiisu, southern-central California
Kitanemuk, southern-central California
Kizh, southern California
Konkow, northern-central California
Kucadikadi, eastern-central California
Kumeyaay, Diegueño, Kumiai, southern California
Cuyamaca complex, late Holocene precolumbian culture
Ipai, southwestern California
Jamul, southwestern California
Tipai, southwestern California and northwestern Mexico
La Jolla complex, southern California, ca. 6050—1000 BCE
Luiseño, southwestern California
Maidu, northeastern California
Konkow, northern California
Mechoopda, northern California
Nisenan, Southern Maidu, eastern-central California
Miwok, Me-wuk, central California
Coast Miwok, west-central California
Lake Miwok, west-central California
Saklan, west-central California 
Valley and Sierra Miwok, eastern-central California
Mohave, southeastern California
Monache, Western Mono, central California
Mono, eastern-central California
Nomlaki, northwestern California
Ohlone, Costanoan, west-central California
Muwekma
Awaswas
Chalon
Chochenyo
Karkin
Mutsun
Ramaytush
Rumsen
Tamyen
Yelamu
Patayan, southern California
Patwin, central California
Suisun, Southern Patwin, central California
Pauma Complex, southern California, ca. 6050—1000 BCE
Pomo, northwestern and central-western California
Salinan, coastal central California
Antoniaño
Migueleño
Serrano, southern California
Shasta northwestern California
Konomihu, northwestern California
Okwanuchu, northwestern California
Tataviam, Allilik (Fernandeño), southern California
Timbisha, southeastern California
Tolowa, northwestern California
Tubatulabal, south-central California
 Bankalachi, on west slopes of the Greenhorn Mountains. 
 Palagewan, on the Kern River above its confluence with the South Fork of the Kern River. 
 Tübatulabal, on the lower reaches of South Fork of the Kern River.
Wappo, north-central California
Washoe, northeastern California
Whilkut, northwestern California
Wintu, northwestern California
Wiyot, northwestern California
Yana, northern-central California
Yahi
Yokuts, central and southern California
Chukchansi, Foothill Yokuts, central California
Northern Valley Yokuts, central California
Tachi tribe, Southern Valley Yokuts, south-central California
Yuki, Ukomno'm, northwestern California
Huchnom, northwestern California
Yurok, northwestern California

References 

Indigenous peoples
 
California groups